Justin Campbell may refer to:
 Justin Campbell (hurler)
 Justin Campbell (baseball)